The Dil-Dil Plateau is a small lava plateau on the west side of the upper valley of Big Creek in the southern Chilcotin District of the Central Interior of British Columbia. The plateau is a shelf-like extension of the subrange of the Chilcotin Ranges containing Taseko Mountain and Mount Vic to the west, and is roughly rectangular in shape, and of c.25–30 km2 in area and forming a transition between the range and the Chilcotin Plateau at 2000m-2300m.

The Dil-Dil Plateau consists of mostly flat lying basaltic lava flows with ages ranging from Miocene to Pliocene on the geologic time scale. These basalts are part of a larger volcanic formation known as the Chilcotin Group.

References

External links
Trail Ventures BC photogallery (see 3/4 of the way down the page, on the right)

Chilcotin Ranges
Landforms of the Chilcotin
Plateaus of British Columbia
Lava plateaus